Kevin Lavelle Braswell (born January 23, 1979) is an American professional basketball coach and former player. He played college basketball for Georgetown University before playing professionally in Europe and New Zealand. He currently serves as assistant coach of the Akita Northern Happinets in the Japanese B.League.

Early life
Braswell was born and raised in Baltimore, Maryland, where he attended Lake Clifton Eastern High School. He then had a prep season at Maine Central Institute in Pittsfield, Maine.

College career
Braswell played four years of college basketball for the Georgetown Hoyas between 1998 and 2002. He finished his career at Georgetown ranking seventh all time in scoring (1,735). His 1,569 field goal attempts were more than all but two players in school history (Eric Floyd and Reggie Williams). He set the all time record for 3-pointers (189), which was broken in December 2007 by Jonathan Wallace. Braswell also first at Georgetown in career assists (695) and steals (349). He was named Third Team All-Big East as a senior and Second Team as a junior, and was named to the Big East All-Rookie Team as a freshman. He started in all 128 of his games for the Hoyas, averaging 13.6 points, 3.9 rebounds, 5.4 assists and 2.7 steals per game.

Professional career
Braswell began his professional career splitting the 2002–03 season in Belgium with Tournai Estaimpuis and in Poland with Spójnia Stargard Szczeciński. For the 2003–04 season, he moved to Italy to play for Cimberio Aironi Novara. In 2004–05, Braswell split the NBDL season with the Florida Flame and Columbus Riverdragons. He finished the season in Turkey with Pınar Karşıyaka.

In July 2005, Braswell played for the Toronto Raptors in the NBA Summer League. He later signed with the Miami Heat on October 3, 2005, but was waived on October 12 after appearing in one preseason game. He subsequently returned to Europe and played seven games for Greek team Kolossos Rodou before leaving in December 2005.

In September 2006, Braswell helped Metros de Santiago win the LNB championship.

For the 2006–07 season, Braswell moved to Russia to play for Standart Samara reg. Toliatti. For the 2007–08 season, he returned to Turkey to play for Selçuk Üniversitesi.

Braswell began the 2008–09 season in Bosnia with HKK Široki before playing out the season in France after joining Cholet Basket in December 2008.

In the 2009–10 season, Braswell began with playing eight games in Israel with Barak Netanya between October 25 and December 14. On January 12, 2010, he signed with the New Zealand Breakers for the last seven games of the 2009–10 NBL season. Following the conclusion of the Breakers' season, Braswell returned to Europe and joined French team Limoges CSP.

After initially signing with Turkish team Aliağa Belediyesi SK for the 2010–11 season, Braswell instead returned to New Zealand and joined the Breakers for the NBL season. In April 2011, he helped the Breakers win the NBL championship. He was subsequently named the NBL Best Sixth Man.

In May 2011, Braswell joined the Southland Sharks for the 2011 New Zealand NBL season. However, just six games into the season, he suffered a season-ending Achilles injury which required surgery. He had never previously experienced a serious injury in his basketball career.

With Braswell still on the comeback trail from injury, the Breakers decided to move in a different direction for the 2011–12 season. He received interest from several other Australian NBL clubs, but a contract failed to materialise, which saw him sign with the Sharks for the 2012 season.

On August 16, 2012, Braswell signed with the Melbourne Tigers for the 2012–13 NBL season. However, on November 5, 2012, he was released by the Tigers after playing hurt over the first five games.

Braswell returned to the Southland Sharks for the 2013 New Zealand NBL season and helped lead them to the championship. He returned to the Sharks in 2014 and had a 45-point effort in his 50th game.

Returning to Southland for a fifth season in 2015, Braswell helped the Sharks win their second title in three years. He retired from professional basketball following the 2015 season, with the Sharks retiring his No. 12 jersey. In 78 career games for the Sharks, he averaged 19.5 points, 3.8 rebounds, 4.8 assists and 2.2 steals per game.

Coaching career
On August 3, 2015, Braswell was appointed head coach of the Wellington Saints for the 2016 New Zealand NBL season. On April 15, 2016, he came out of retirement for a one-game stint, helping his depleted Saints in a 97–72 loss to the Canterbury Rams. He went on to guide the Saints to the championship in his first season as coach.

In 2017, Braswell guided the Saints to back-to-back titles behind an undefeated 20–0 campaign and New Zealand NBL Coach of the Year honours. He returned to Wellington for a third and final season in 2018, leading the Saints to a third straight grand final where they lost to the Southland Sharks.

On April 16, 2018, Braswell was appointed head coach of the New Zealand Breakers on a three-year deal. However, he was released from his contract in June 2019 after completing just one season.

In May 2020, Braswell was appointed head coach of the Auckland Huskies of the New Zealand NBL. He parted ways with the Huskies following the 2020 season.

On June 25, 2021, Braswell was appointed assistant coach of the Akita Northern Happinets in the Japanese B.League.

Personal
Braswell's immediate family includes his mother, Millicent Boone, and his younger brother, James Boone.

See also
List of NCAA Division I men's basketball career steals leaders

References

External links
French League profile
"Getting to know the 'real' Kevin Braswell" at nzbreakers.basketball

1979 births
Living people
American expatriate basketball people in Australia
American expatriate basketball people in Belgium
American expatriate basketball people in Bosnia and Herzegovina
American expatriate basketball people in France
American expatriate basketball people in Greece
American expatriate basketball people in Israel
American expatriate basketball people in Italy
American expatriate basketball people in Poland
American expatriate basketball people in Russia
American expatriate basketball people in the Dominican Republic
American expatriate basketball people in Turkey
American men's basketball players
Basketball players from Baltimore
Cholet Basket players
Columbus Riverdragons players
Florida Flame players
Georgetown Hoyas men's basketball players
HKK Široki players
Karşıyaka basketball players
Kolossos Rodou B.C. players
Limoges CSP players
Melbourne Tigers players
New Zealand Breakers players
Point guards
Southland Sharks players
Wellington Saints players